Underbarrow is a small village in Cumbria, England, located  west of Kendal. The village is in the Lake District National Park. It is in the civil parish of Underbarrow and Bradleyfield, in South Lakeland district, and has a parish council. In the 2001 census Underbarrow and Bradleyfield had a population of 351, decreasing at the 2011 census to 330.

Politics
In 1974 under the Local Government Act 1972 Underbarrow became a part of the South Lakeland district whose administrative centre is Kendal.

Underbarrow is part of the Westmorland and Lonsdale parliamentary constituency for which Tim Farron is the current MP representing the Liberal Democrats.

Famous residents 
 Edward Burrough (1634–1663), the Quaker, was born here

See also

Listed buildings in Underbarrow and Bradleyfield
Kendal
South Lakeland

References

External links

 Underbarrow village website
 Cumbria County History Trust: Underbarrow and Bradleyfield (nb: provisional research only – see Talk page)

Location Grid

Westmorland
Villages in Cumbria
South Lakeland District